Tully Frederick "Topsy" Hartsel (June 26, 1874 – October 14, 1944) was an American outfielder in Major League Baseball. He was born in Polk, Ohio, and played for the Louisville Colonels (1898–99), Cincinnati Reds (1900), Chicago Orphans (1901) and Philadelphia Athletics (1902–11), with whom he won the World Series in 1910. On September 10, 1901, he established the record for putouts by a left fielder in a nine-inning game, with 11 against the Brooklyn Superbas.

In a 14 year, 1356 game major league career, Hartsel recorded a .276 batting average with 826 runs, 31 home runs, 341 RBI, 247 stolen bases and 837 base on balls. His career fielding percentage as an outfielder was .956. In the 1905 and 1910 World Series, he hit .227 (5-for-22).

Philadelphia manager Connie Mack looked for players with quiet and disciplined personal lives, having seen many players in his playing days destroy themselves and their teams through heavy drinking. Mack himself never drank; before the 1910 World Series he asked all his players to "take the pledge" not to drink during the Series. When Topsy Hartsel told Mack he needed a drink the night before the final game, Mack told him to do what he thought best, but in these circumstances "if it was me, I'd die before I took a drink."

Hartsel died in Toledo, Ohio, on October 14, 1944.

See also
 List of Major League Baseball annual runs scored leaders
 List of Major League Baseball annual stolen base leaders

References

Sources

1874 births
1944 deaths
19th-century baseball players
Major League Baseball outfielders
Louisville Colonels players
Cincinnati Reds players
Chicago Orphans players
Philadelphia Athletics players
American League stolen base champions
Burlington Colts players
Montgomery Senators players
Indianapolis Hoosiers (minor league) players
Toledo Mud Hens managers
Toledo Mud Hens players
Baseball players from Ohio
People from Ashland County, Ohio